Undertow is a 1949 American  film noir crime film directed by William Castle and starring Scott Brady, John Russell, Dorothy Hart and Peggy Dow. It is the story of an ex-con, a former Chicago mobster, who is accused of the murder of a high-ranking Chicago boss.  The movie marks the second film to feature a young Rock Hudson and the first in which he received a film credit for his work.

Plot
Tony Reagan (Scott Brady) was a low-level member of the Chicago syndicate; he was run out of town back then for being involved with the kingpin Big Jim's niece. Seven years later, Reagan has been vacationing in Reno, at a lodge in which he intends to invest with the father of an old army buddy. He bumps into an old friend/former colleague from Chicago named Danny Morgan (John Russell). It turns out they are both hoping to soon be married.

On his way home to Chicago to propose to his girl, Reagan shares the flight with a schoolteacher, Ann McKnight (Peggy Dow), someone he met at a Reno casino and helped win at the gambling table. At the airport, he is met by the police; it seems they have been tipped off that Reagan is looking to stir trouble with Big Jim.

The police put a tail on him, which he shakes on a Chicago elevated train. Reagan meets up with his bride-to-be, Sally Lee (Dorothy Hart). He tells her he will go to Big Jim to make peace. But when the uncle is murdered, Reagan is framed for it.

On the run from both the police and  the unknown murderers, Reagan enlists the help of McKnight and an old buddy, Charles Reckling (Bruce Bennett), a detective. They discover the truth: Morgan is also engaged to Sally Lee, and together they are responsible for murdering her uncle and framing Reagan.

Reagan manages to clear himself, however, after which he and McKnight end up in each other's arms, bound for that lodge in Reno.

Cast
 Scott Brady as Tony Reagan
 John Russell as Danny Morgan
 Dorothy Hart as Sally Lee
 Peggy Dow as Ann McKnight
 Bruce Bennett as Reckling 
 Gregg Martell as Frost
 Robert Anderson as Stoner
 Dan Ferniel as Gene (as Daniel Ferniel)
 Rock Hudson as Detective (as Roc Hudson)
 Charles Sherlock as Cooper
 Anne P. Kramer as Clerk (as Ann Pearce)
 Robert Easton as Fisher

References

External links
 
 
 

1949 films
1949 drama films
1940s crime thriller films
American crime thriller films
American black-and-white films
Film noir
Films directed by William Castle
Universal Pictures films
1940s English-language films
1940s American films